The Barnes House is a historic house at 183 Pine Street, Quincy, Massachusetts.  The -story house was built in the 1870s, and is a fine local example of Italianate styling.  It is three bays wide, with the first floor left bays taken up by a large projecting bay with four sash windows and a bracketed eave.  The windows on the second floor have bracketed cornices, and the front entry is sheltered by a decorated porch with turned posts.  The house is further distinctive because it has a surviving period barn/carriage house.  The builder was probably Howard C. Barnes, who was in the musical instruments business.

The house was listed on the National Register of Historic Places in 1989.

References

Italianate architecture in Massachusetts
Houses in Quincy, Massachusetts
National Register of Historic Places in Quincy, Massachusetts
Houses on the National Register of Historic Places in Norfolk County, Massachusetts